Parapoynx panpenealis is a moth in the family Crambidae. It was described by Harrison Gray Dyar Jr. in 1924. It is found in Mexico.

References

Acentropinae
Moths described in 1924